Thyrocopa apatela, the grasshopper moth or Haleakala flightless moth, is a species of brachypterous (flightless) moth from the Hawaiian island of Maui.

This species appears to be undergoing severe range reduction. Although it was found as low as 1,524 meters in the 1970s, recent collecting indicates it is now restricted to areas above 2,900 meters. This may be the result of the range expansion of introduced ants on Haleakalā.

The length of the forewings is 8–11 mm. Adults are on wing from May to August. It is largely diurnal, though they occasionally come to light. Adults are mostly collected while hopping between sunny rocks.

The larva is likely a generalist, feeding on Dubautia and other plant species found in the alpine scrub of Haleakalā's high-elevation areas. Larvae have also been found feeding on wind-blown debris under small rocks.

References

External links

apatela
Endemic moths of Hawaii
Biota of Maui
Moths described in 1907